Suillia mikii is a European fly species of the family Heleomyzidae.

References

Heleomyzidae
Diptera of Europe
Insects described in 1886